Gossip is an American documentary television miniseries directed and produced by Jenny Carchman. It follows the life and career of gossip columnist Cindy Adams of the New York Post. It consisted of four episodes and premiered on August 22, 2021, on Showtime.

Plot
The series follows the life and career of Cindy Adams, a gossip columnist for The New York Post.

Episodes

Production
In November 2019, it was announced Jenny Carchman would direct and produce a documentary series revolving around Cindy Adams for Showtime, with Ron Howard set to executive produce under his Imagine Documentaries banner.

Reception

Critical reception
On Rotten Tomatoes, the series holds an approval rating of 80% based on 5 reviews, with an average rating of 7.50/10. On Metacritic, it has a weighted average score of 57 out of 100, based on 5 critics, indicating "mixed or average reviews".

References

External links
 

American biographical series
English-language television shows
Showtime (TV network) original programming
2021 American television series debuts
2020s American documentary television series
2020s American television miniseries
New York Post
Television series by Imagine Entertainment